Slayground is a 1983 British crime thriller film directed by Terry Bedford. Starring Peter Coyote, Mel Smith and Billie Whitelaw, the film is adapted from Slayground, the 14th Parker novel (although the main character has been renamed to "Stone" in this adaptation), written by Donald E. Westlake under the name Richard Stark.

Cast
 Peter Coyote as Stone
 Mel Smith as Terry Abbatt
 Billie Whitelaw as Madge
 Philip Sayer as Costello
 Bill Luhrs as Joe Sheer
 Marie Masters as Joni
 Clarence Felder as Orxel
 Ned Eisenberg as Lonzini
 David Hayward as Laufman
 Michael M. Ryan as Danard
 Barrett Mulligan as Lucy
 Kelli Maroney as Jolene
 Margareta Arvidssen as Grete
 Rosemary Martin as Dr. King
 Malcolm Terris as Venner
 Jon Morrison as Webb
 Cassie Stuart as Fran
 Debby Bishop as Beth
 Stephen Yardley as Turner
 P. H. Moriarty as Seeley
 Zig Byfield as Sams
 Erick Ray Evans as Malpas
 Bill Dean as Compére
 Ozzie Yue as Waiter
 Tony Devon as Joey

Production
The novel Slayground was published in 1971.

In early 1983 Barry Spikings left Thorn EMI and Verity Lambert was appointed head of production. Lambert's first slate of films was Slayground, Comfort and Joy, Illegal Aliens (which became Morons from Outer Space) and Dreamchild. Filming had finished by November 1983. "I believe all these films have international appeal," said Lambert.

Reception
Monthly Film Bulletin called it "Flashdance meets film noir".

References

External links
 
 
 
 
Slayground at British Horror Film
Review of novel at the Westlake Review
Book at Donald Westlake

1983 films
1980s crime thriller films
British crime thriller films
Films based on American novels
Films based on works by Donald E. Westlake
Films set in amusement parks
EMI Films films
1980s English-language films
1980s British films